The First Day of the Rest of Your Life is a 2008 French comedy-drama film written and directed by Rémi Bezançon. The film received 9 César Award nominations, winning three (Best Editing, Most Promising Actor and Most Promising Actress).

Cast
Jacques Gamblin as Robert Duval
Zabou Breitman as Marie-Jeanne Duval
Déborah François as Fleur Duval
Marc-André Grondin as Raphaël Duval
Pio Marmaï as Albert Duval
Roger Dumas as Pierre
Cécile Cassel as Prune
Stanley Weber as Éric
Sarah Cohen-Hadria as Clara
Camille De Pazzis as Moïra
François-Xavier Demaison as Doctor Marcaurel
Gilles Lellouche as The white rasta

Awards and nominations
César Awards (France)
Won: Best Editing (Sophie Reine)
Won: Most Promising Actor (Marc-André Grondin)
Won: Most Promising Actress (Déborah François)
Nominated: Best Actor – Leading Role (Jacques Gamblin)
Nominated: Best Director (Rémi Bezançon)
Nominated: Best Film
Nominated: Best Music (Sinclair)
Nominated: Best Writing – Original (Rémi Bezançon)
Nominated: Most Promising Actor (Pio Marmaï)
Étoiles d'Or (France)
Won: Best Writer (Rémi Bezançon)

References

External links
 

2008 films
2008 comedy-drama films
Films directed by Rémi Bezançon
French comedy-drama films
2000s French-language films
Tragicomedy films
2000s French films